Qian Wangwei (born 24 September 1994) is a Chinese para-cyclist, who won bronze in the women's 500 metre time trial C1–3 event at the 2020 Summer Paralympics.

References

1994 births
Living people
Chinese female cyclists
Sportswomen with disabilities
Paralympic bronze medalists for China
Medalists at the 2020 Summer Paralympics
Cyclists at the 2020 Summer Paralympics
Paralympic medalists in cycling
Para-cyclists
People from Qidong, Jiangsu
Cyclists from Jiangsu
21st-century Chinese women